Gaslight is a 1958 television play broadcast by the Australian Broadcasting Corporation based on the 1938 play Gas Light by Patrick Hamilton.  It starred Beverley Dunn.

Plot
Years after her aunt was murdered in her home, a young woman, Bella Manningham, moves back into the house with her new husband. However, he has a secret that he will do anything to protect, even if means driving his wife insane.

Cast
 Beverley Dunn as Bella Manningham	
 Brian James as Manningham
 John Morgan as Inspector Rough
 Mary Ward as Elizabeth
 Judith Godden as Nancy the housemaid
 Neville Thurgood as police constable

Production
William Sterling came down from Sydney to direct. It was the eleventh play to be performed live on Melbourne television – the others were Roundabout, The Twelve Pound Look, Holiday in Biarritz, Fair Passenger, The Right Person, Dark Brown, The Duke in Darkness, The Sound of Thunder and Killer in Close Up.

It was one of a number of TV performances given by Dunn, others including Roundabout, The Lark, The Small Victory and Fair Passenger.

Reception
The Sydney Morning Herald said the "production was well received by viewers and critics in Melbourne."

See also
 List of live television plays broadcast on Australian Broadcasting Corporation (1950s)

References

External links
 

1950s Australian television plays
Australian Broadcasting Corporation original programming
English-language television shows
Australian live television shows
Black-and-white Australian television shows
1958 television plays